Vasil Vasilev (born 13 October 1984) is a Bulgarian football defender, who currently plays for FC Eurocollege. He is known as an affectionate Botev Plovdiv fan, having grown amongst the ultras as a younger kid.

Career
Vasilev is a product of the Botev youth academy. On 16 August 2003, he made his debut for the first squad in a match against Belasitsa Petrich. In July 2009, he was given the captain's armband. After the club was administratively relegated from A PFG due to financial difficulties and a number of related issues, he signed with Bulgarian South-West V AFG team PFC Hebar Pazardzhik, where he recorded 12 matches and scored 2 goals. When Botev Plovdiv was revived in the summer of 2010, Vasilev returned to the club of his heart.

Trivia
 Vasilev's nickname is "The Pillar".
 Vasilev has numerous tattoos, one of which is of Hristo Botev - a Bulgarian national hero, after which the football club is named.

Statistics
Updated 15 August 2010

References

External links
 Player Profile at fceurocollege.com

Bulgarian footballers
1984 births
Living people
Footballers from Plovdiv
Association football defenders
FC Hebar Pazardzhik players
Botev Plovdiv players
First Professional Football League (Bulgaria) players